The 2013–14 North Superleague was the thirteenth staging of the North Superleague, the highest tier of league competition in the North Region of the Scottish Junior Football Association. The season began on 3 August 2013. The winners of this competition are eligible to enter the 2014–15 Scottish Cup.

Culter won the title on 6 May 2014.

Member clubs for the 2013–14 season
Culter were the reigning champions.

New Elgin and East End were promoted from the North First Division and replaced the relegated Lewis United and Fraserburgh United.

League table

Results

References

External links
 North Region JFA

6
SJFA North Region Superleague seasons